Eilis O'Connell (born 1953, Derry, Northern Ireland) is an abstract sculptor. She is known for her free-standing works and wall pieces.

Early life and education 
O'Connell was born in Derry and educated at the Crawford School of Art, Cork, Ireland and Massachusetts College of Art and Design, Boston, Massachusetts, USA.

Career 

O'Connell has been commissioned to make public sculptures throughout the UK and Ireland.

She is a founder director of the National Sculpture Factory (Cork); a member of Aosdána and the Royal Hibernian Academy; and a former member of the Arts Council of Ireland.

Her honors include the Art & Work Award from Wapping Arts Trust, and Royal Society of Arts Award (1998). O'Connell's works were displayed at the Biennale de Paris (1982) and the São Paulo Art Biennial (1985). She has received fellowships from The British School at Rome and PS 1 in New York.

The artist's 1988 work "The Great Wall of Kinsale is one of the most contentious public artworks ever erected in Ireland." Composed of several sections and forms, it is also the longest sculpture in Ireland at 179 feet. The large rusted steel sculpture drew protest, concerns of safety, an attempt to deinstall it, and criticism of its appearance. Eventually, the rusty metal was painted, a water feature was added, and barriers were placed around it without O'Connell's permission. As such, she considers the work to have been "destroyed". In artist Sean Lynch's 2011 show, A Rocky Road, at the Crawford Art Gallery, he investigated the legacy of O'Connell's Great Wall of Kinsale.

She exhibited sculptures at Eileen Gray's E-1027 house in France in 2018.

O'Connell's work is in the collections of IMMA, Lismore Castle, Cass Sculpture Foundation, Chatsworth, Antony House and more.

See also
 List of public art in the City of London
 List of public art in Bristol
 List of public art in Cork city

References

Bibliography

External links

Official website

1953 births
Living people
Artists from Derry (city)
Sculptors from Northern Ireland
Abstract sculptors
British women sculptors
Alumni of Cork Institute of Technology
Massachusetts College of Art and Design alumni
Aosdána members
21st-century British women artists
Irish contemporary artists

21st-century Irish women artists